Fookes is a surname. Notable people with the surname include:

Ernest Fookes (1847–1948), New Zealand rugby union footballer
Janet Fookes (born 1936), British politician
Ursula Fookes (1906–1991), English painter and printmaker

See also
Fooks